The following elections occurred in the year 1942.

Asia
 1942 Japanese general election

Europe

 1942 Irish local elections

Iceland
 July 1942 Icelandic parliamentary election
 October 1942 Icelandic parliamentary election

Portugal
 1942 Portuguese legislative election
 1942 Portuguese presidential election

United Kingdom
 1942 Cardiff East by-election
 1942 North East Derbyshire by-election
 1942 Maldon by-election
 1942 Newcastle-under-Lyme by-election
 1942 Nuneaton by-election
 1942 Poplar South by-election
 1942 Rothwell by-election
 1942 Salisbury by-election
 1942 Spennymoor by-election
 1942 Whitechapel and St Georges by-election
 1942 Windsor by-election

Central America
 1942 Honduran legislative election

North America

Canada
 1942 Edmonton municipal election
 1942 Ottawa municipal election
 1942 Toronto municipal election

United States
 United States House of Representatives elections in California, 1942
 1942 California gubernatorial election
 1942 Maine gubernatorial election
 1942 Minnesota gubernatorial election
 1942 New York state election
 United States House of Representatives elections in South Carolina, 1942
 United States Senate election in South Carolina, 1942
 1942 South Carolina gubernatorial election
 1942 United States House of Representatives elections

United States Senate
 1942 United States Senate elections
 United States Senate election in Massachusetts, 1942

South America
 1942 Argentine legislative election
 1942 Bolivian legislative election
 1942 Chilean presidential election
 1942 Colombian presidential election
 1942 Uruguayan general election

See also
 :Category:1942 elections

1942
Elections